Sophie Daumier (24 November 1934 – 31 December 2003) was a French film actress. She appeared in 28 films between 1956 and 1979. She was born as Elisabeth Hugon in Boulogne-sur-Mer, Pas-de-Calais, the daughter of composer Georges Hugon. She was married to Guy Bedos from 1965 to 1977; the marriage ended in divorce. She died from Huntington's disease on 31 December 2003 in Paris. She was 69 years old.

Selected filmography
 On Foot, on Horse, and on Wheels (1957)
 Amelie or The Time to Love (1961)
 Carom Shots (1963)
 Sweet and Sour (1963)
 Crime on a Summer Morning (1965)
 For a Few Extra Dollars (1966)
 A Simple Story (1978)

References

External links

1934 births
2003 deaths
People from Boulogne-sur-Mer
French film actresses
20th-century French actresses
Burials at Père Lachaise Cemetery
Neurological disease deaths in France
Deaths from Huntington's disease